The Béarn 6 was a six-cylinder air-cooled piston aircraft engine produced in France in the late 1930s, 1940s and early 1950s.

Design and development
The Béarn 6 suffered from lack of development and was not a commercial success, most production engines had been removed from service by 1950 due to poor reliability.

Variants
6C
6D
6D.07

Applications
 Dassault MD-303
 Nord 2101 Norazur
 Dewoitine HD.731
 SFCA Lignel 16
 S.C.A.N. 20
 SNCASO SO.90
 SNCASE SE-700A
 S.N.C.A.C. NC.420

Specifications (Béarn 6D)

See also

References

1930s aircraft piston engines